The 1953 Polish Speedway season was the 1953 season of motorcycle speedway in Poland.

Individual

Polish Individual Speedway Championship
The 1953 Individual Speedway Polish Championship was held over four legs.

Rybnik, 14 June 1953
Warsawa, 30 August 1953
Leszno, 13 September 1953
Wrocław, 4 October 1953

Team

Team Speedway Polish Championship
The 1953 Team Speedway Polish Championship was the sixth edition of the Team Polish Championship.

Rules

In First League, matches were played with part two teams, without it playing it matches return.  Teams were made up of 6 drivers plus 2 reserves. The score of heat: 3–2–1–0. Mecz consisted of 9 heats. For winning a game a team received 2 points, draw – 1 point, lost – 0 points. The drivers from main squad started in a match three times. The quantity of small points was added up.

Before the season it was established that only 4 full rounds would take place with only the first 8 teams competing in the 5th round. After playing 5 rounds the 4 first teams played in the  "Final Round".

Stal Ostrów Wlkp. was moved to Świętochłowice.

First League

Final Round

References

Poland Individual
Poland Team
Speedway